The following is a list of events and releases that happened in 2019 in music in the United States.

Notable events

January
2 – Daryl Dragon of Captain & Tennille died at the age of 76 due to renal failure, with his ex-wife Toni Tennille at his side.
7 – Andy Grammer performed the national anthem, and Imagine Dragons performed the halftime show during the 2019 College Football Playoff National Championship with special guest Lil Wayne.
17 – Christina Perri released her first album in five years, Songs for Carmella: Lullabies & Sing-a-Longs
18 – Pedro the Lion released their first album in fifteen years, Phoenix.
Sharon Van Etten released her first album in five years, Remind Me Tomorrow.
25 – The Backstreet Boys released their first album in six years, DNA.

February
3 – Gladys Knight performed the National Anthem, and Maroon 5, Big Boi, and Travis Scott performed the halftime show during Super Bowl LIII at Mercedes-Benz Stadium in Atlanta, where their performance received negative reviews from the critics naming the worst Super Bowl performances in history.
8 – Jessica Pratt released her first album in four years, Quiet Signs.
10 – The 61st Annual Grammy Awards, hosted by Alicia Keys, took place. The show returned to Staples Center in Los Angeles. Childish Gambino and Kacey Musgraves took home the most awards with four each. Musgraves won Album of the Year with Golden Hour, while Gambino won both Record of the Year and Song of the Year for "This Is America". Dua Lipa won Best New Artist.

March
1 - Jonas Brothers released their first single in six years, Sucker, which reached #1 in eight countries, including the top of the Billboard Hot 100.
 Queensrÿche released their first album in almost four years, The Verdict.
 Gary Clark, Jr. released his first album in four years, This Land.
3–6 – The two part documentary Leaving Neverland provoked a backlash causing radio stations to ban  Michael Jackson's music, in turn leading Jackson fans into protest.
8 – Misery Index released their first album in five years called Rituals of Power.
 Tesla released their first album in five years, Shock. 
22 – La Dispute released their first album in five years, Panorama.
29 – George Strait released his first album in four years, Honky Tonk Time Machine
31 – Rapper Nipsey Hussle was shot and killed out front of his store in Los Angeles, CA. He was 33 years old.

April
5 – Brooks & Dunn released their first album in twelve years, Reboot
Sara Bareilles released her first album in four years, Amidst the Chaos. 
7 – The 54th Academy of Country Music Awards took place at the MGM Grand Garden Arena in Las Vegas.
Billie Eilish became the first musician born in the 21st century to top the Billboard 200 chart with When We All Fall Asleep, Where Do We Go? 
17 - Motown Records celebrated 60th anniversary.
26 – Rob Thomas released his first album in four years, Chip Tooth Smile.
Taylor Swift, in collaboration with Panic! at the Disco lead Brendon Urie, released her highly anticipated lead single "ME!" off her seventh studio album Lover. The song made the biggest leap in Billboard Hot 100 history, from 100–2, and the song's music video broke the Vevo 24 hour record.

May
1 – The Billboard Music Awards took place in Las Vegas.
3 – Ashley Tisdale released her first album in 10 years, Symptoms.
 – Bad Religion released their first album in six years, Age of Unreason.
 – L7 released their first album in twenty years, Scatter the Rats. 
 – Vampire Weekend released their first album in six years, Father of the Bride.
10 – Ciara released her first album in four years, Beauty Marks.
 – Possessed released their first album in 33 years, Revelations of Oblivion.
19 – Laine Hardy won the seventeenth season of American Idol. Alejandro Aranda is named runner-up.
21 – Maelyn Jarmon won the sixteen season of The Voice. Gyth Rigdon was the runner-up. Dexter Roberts and Andrew Sevener finished third and fourth place respectively.
24 – Flying Lotus released his first album in five years, Flamagra.

June
5 – The CMT Music Awards took place at the Bridgestone Arena in Nashville.
7 – Boxing Gandhis released their first album in seven years, Culture War.
Jonas Brothers released their first album in 10 years, Happiness Begins.
Perry Farrell released his first solo album in eighteen years, Kind Heaven.
11 – The New York Times Magazine publishes an investigative report by music journalist Jody Rosen, detailing the extent of the 2008 Universal fire. The article reveals that much of the fire's damage was concealed from the public for well over a decade, and that the full extent of the fire included the destruction of up to 175,000 master recordings of songs— both released and unreleased— by Universal Music Group-owned artists. UMG representatives would initially dispute the accuracy of the article, before eventually confirming that their archives had indeed sustained considerable losses as a result of the fire.
14 – Baroness released their first album in four years, Gold & Grey.
 – Bruce Springsteen released his first album in five years and his first of all original material in seven years, Western Stars.
 – Madonna released her first album in four years, Madame X.
 – The Cherry Poppin' Daddies released Bigger Life, their first album of original material in six years and their first ska album in 11 years.
16 – Adema parted ways with original lead singer Mark Chavez for the third time. He was replaced by Julien-K frontman and former Orgy guitarist Ryan Shuck.
19 – Original Unwritten Law drummer Wade Youman left the band for the second time.
21 – The Raconteurs released their first album in eleven years, Help Us Stranger.
28 – The Black Keys released their first album in five years, Let's Rock.

July
1 – Janet Weiss left Sleater-Kinney after 23 years with the band.
5 – Westside Gunn released his major debut album FLYGOD is An Awesome GOD
26 – Mini Mansions released their first album in four years, Guy Walks Into A Bar.
29 – Lil Nas X reached his seventeenth week atop the Billboard Hot 100 with "Old Town Road"; obtaining the all-time record.

August
2 – Diana DeGarmo released her first album in 15 years, Gemini.
O-Town released their first album in five years, The O.T.W.N. Album.
9 – Slipknot released their first album in five years, We Are Not Your Kind.
16 – Sleater-Kinney released their first album in four years, The Center Won't Hold.
19 – Billie Eilish became the first artist born in the 21st century to top the Billboard Hot 100 with "Bad Guy"
26 – The VMA's took place at the Prudential Center in East Rutherford, New Jersey.
30 – Tool released their first studio album in 13 years, Fear Inoculum.

September
6 – Melanie Martinez released her first album in four years, K-12.
13 – Cold released their first album in eight years, The Things We Can't Stop.
 Eddie Money died at age 70 following a battle with esophageal cancer.
15 – Ric Ocasek, lead singer of The Cars, was found dead at 75.
26 – Nivea released her first album in thirteen years, Mirrors.

October
4 – that dog released their first album in 22 years, Old LP. It was also their first album without founding member Petra Haden.
 Akon released his first album in ten years, El Negreeto.
 Lagwagon released their first album in five years, Railer.
11 – Chris Knight released his first album in seven years, Almost Daylight.
29 - After seven months of banned Michael Jackson music, some radio stations re-added some of his hits.

November
1 – Hootie & the Blowfish released their first album in fourteen years, Imperfect Circle.
2 — Guns N' Roses conclude the Not in This Lifetime... Tour, which began in April 2016, at the Colosseum at Caesars Palace in Las Vegas. The tour ends as the highest-grossing of all time by an American act and the third-highest overall.
13 — The Country Music Association Awards took place. Hosted by Carrie Underwood with special guests: Dolly Parton and Reba McEntire.
15 — Céline Dion released her first English-language studio album in 6 years with Courage and became her first number-one album since 2002 in the US (5th overall).
18 – Mötley Crüe utilized a loophole in their "Cessation of Touring" agreement to reform for a stadium tour with Def Leppard, Poison and Joan Jett & the Blackhearts in summer 2020.
24 – The American Music Awards took place at the Microsoft Theater in Los Angeles. Taylor Swift won the most awards with six.
29 – Cattle Decapitation released their first album in four years, Death Atlas.
30 – Slayer played their final concert at The Forum in Inglewood, California, subsequently disbanding 38 years after their formation.

December
6 – Sufjan Stevens released his first album in four years, titled The Decalogue.
8 – Rapper Juice WRLD died of a seizure at Midway International Airport in Chicago, Illinois. He was 21 years old.
15 – Red Hot Chili Peppers parted ways with guitarist Josh Klinghoffer, and then announced that John Frusciante would rejoin them for the third time.
17 – Jake Hoot was named winner of the seventeenth season of The Voice. Ricky Duran was named runner-up. Katie Kadan and Rose Short finished third and fourth place respectively.
21 – 25 years after its original release, Mariah Carey's "All I Want for Christmas is You" reached No. 1 for the first time on Billboard Hot 100, breaking several records and becoming her 19th No. 1 on the chart.

Bands formed
Boys World
Simple Creatures
Sunday Service

Bands reformed

Bands disbanded
The Apocalypse Blues Revue
Chris Robinson Brotherhood
Femme Fatale
Fischerspooner
Get Scared
J. Roddy Walston and the Business
The Muffs
Nitro
The Pains of Being Pure at Heart
Pillorian
Prophets of Rage
Slayer
Superjoint
Yeasayer

Albums released in 2019

January

February

March

April

May

June

July

August

September

October
{|class="wikitable"
|-
! Date
! Album
! Artist
! Genre (s)
|-
|rowspan="10"|4
|Casualty
|Anna Akana
|Pop
|-
|El Negreeto
|Akon
|
|-
|Closer Than Together<ref>{{cite magazine|title=The Avett Brothers Take a Ride With Death in New 'High Steppin Video|url=https://www.rollingstone.com/music/music-country/avett-brothers-high-steppin-video-847664/|magazine=Rolling Stone|last=Beaugez|first=Jim|date=June 13, 2019}}</ref>
|The Avett Brothers
|Folk rock
|-
|Interrobang|Bayside
|Pop punk
|-
|Deceiver|DIIV
|Indie rock
|-
|Hello Exile|The Menzingers
|Punk rock
|-
|Up And Rolling|North Mississippi Allstars
|
|-
|All Mirrors|Angel Olsen
|
|-
|Old LP|that dog.
|
|-
|Ode to Joy|Wilco
|
|-
|rowspan="7"|11
|Sun Songs|Art Alexakis
|Rock
|-
|Two Hands|Big Thief
|Indie rock
|-
|The Act|The Devil Wears Prada
|
|-
|Plunge and Surface|Goldroom
|
|-
|Almost Daylight|Chris Knight
|
|-
|Somebody's Knocking|Mark Lanegan
|
|-
|Devour You|Starcrawler
|Rock
|-
|rowspan="12"|18
|Fear Caller|The Almost
|Alternative rock
|-
|Walk The Sky|Alter Bridge
|
|-
|There Existed an Addiction To Blood|Clipping
|Hip hop
|-
|Kin|Electric Guest
|
|-
|The Help Machine|Fastball
|
|-
|Angels with Tattos|Skylar Grey
|
|-
|Surviving|Jimmy Eat World
|Alternative rock
|-
|Panic Attack|Lionize
|
|-
|Pang|Caroline Polachek
|
|-
|The Decalogue|Sufjan Stevens
|
|-
|Screamer|Third Eye Blind
|Alternative rock
|-
|You Deserve Love|White Reaper
|
|-
|rowspan="7"|25
|Bigger Than Life|Black Marble
|
|-
|Cry|Cigarettes After Sex
|
|-
|Sweating the Plague|Guided By Voices
|
|-
|Cheap Queen|King Princess
|
|-
|All Hail|Norma Jean
|
|-
|Old Dominion|Old Dominion
|Country
|-
|Daylight|Grace Potter
|
|-
|30
|Supermoon (EP)
|Charly Bliss
|
|-
|31
|Ghetto Cowboy|Yelawolf
|Hip hop
|}

November

December

Top songs on record

Billboard Hot 100 No. 1 Songs
"7 Rings" – Ariana Grande 
"All I Want for Christmas Is You" – Mariah Carey 
"Bad Guy" – Billie Eilish 
"Circles" – Post Malone 
"Heartless" – The Weeknd 
"Highest in the Room" – Travis Scott 
"Lose You to Love Me" – Selena Gomez 
"Old Town Road" – Lil Nas X feat. Billy Ray Cyrus 
"Señorita" – Shawn Mendes and Camila Cabello 
"Shallow" – Lady Gaga and Bradley Cooper 
"Someone You Loved" – Lewis Capaldi 
"Sucker" – Jonas Brothers 
"Sunflower" – Post Malone and Swae Lee 
"Thank U, Next" – Ariana Grande 
"Truth Hurts" – Lizzo 
"Without Me" – Halsey 

Billboard Hot 100 Top 20 Hits
All songs that reached the Top 20 on the Billboard'' Hot 100 chart during the year, complete with peak chart placement.

Deaths

January 1 – 
Shane Bisnett, 31, metalcore bassist (Ice Nine Kills)
Pegi Young, 66, musician, activist
January 2 – Daryl Dragon, 76, musician, songwriter, keyboardist (Captain & Tennille)
January 3 – Steve Ripley, 69, singer songwriter (The Tractors)
January 5 – Alvin Fielder, 83, jazz drummer
January 7 – Clydie King, 75, pop and rock singer
January 9 – Joseph Jarman, 81, jazz saxophonist
January 10 – Larry Cunningham, 67, R&B singer
January 12 – Sanger D. Shafer, 84, country singer, songwriter
January 13
Bonnie Guitar, 95, country singer
David "Frenchy" O'Brien, 71, pop drummer (Animotion)
January 16 – Lorna Doom, 61, punk rock bassist
January 17 – Reggie Young, 82, country and rock guitarist, session musician
January 21 –
Kaye Ballard, 93, musical theatre actress, comedian
Edwin Birdsong, 77, funk keyboardist
Maxine Brown, 87, country singer
January 25 – Jacqueline Steiner, 94, folk singer, songwriter
January 26 – Bruce Corbitt, 56, heavy metal vocalist
January 28 – Paul Whaley, 72, rock drummer
January 29 – James Ingram, 66, R&B singer
January 31 – Harold Bradley, 93, country guitarist
February 2 – Alex Brown, 52, rock guitarist (Gorilla Biscuits)
 February 3 – Tim Landers, 62, vocalist and singer
February 11 – Harvey Scales, 78, R&B soul singer and songwriter
February 15 – Kofi Burbridge, 57, keyboardist and flautist
February 16 – Ken Nordine, 98, spoken word jazz
February 17 – Ethel Ennis, 86, jazz musician
February 19 – Artie Wayne, 77, pop singer, producer
February 20 – Dominick Argento, 91, composer
February 21 – 
Peter Tork, 77, musician (The Monkees)
Gus Backus, 81, doo-wop singer
Jackie Shane, 78, soul singer
February 24 – Mac Wiseman, 93, bluegrass musician
March 1 – Stephan Ellis, 69, rock bassist (Survivor)
March 2 – Al Hazan, 84, pianist (B. Bumble and the Stingers), songwriter and record producer
March 4 – Mike Walker, 50, rock drummer (Aranda)
March 5 – Sara Romweber, 55, drummer for Let's Active, Snatches of Pink and Dex Romweber Duo
March 6 – James Dapogny, 78, jazz pianist
March 8 – Eddie Taylor Jr., 46, blues singer and guitarist
March 10 – Asa Brebner, 65, singer-songwriter and guitarist
March 11 – Hal Blaine, 90, rock and pop drummer
March 12 – John Kilzer, 62, singer and songwriter
March 16 – 
Dick Dale, 81, surf rock guitarist
David White, 79, doo-wop and rock and roll singer (Danny & the Juniors)
March 17 – Andre Williams, 82, R&B singer
March 21 – Doris Duke, 77, gospel and soul singer
March 25 – Scott Walker, 76, experimental pop singer (The Walker Brothers)
March 28 - Maury Laws, 95, composer
March 31 – Nipsey Hussle, 33, rapper
April 2 –
April 3 - Shawn Smith, 53, singer and songwriter
Rick Elias, Christian singer and songwriter
Kim English, 48, house singer and Christian singer
April 4 – Tiger Merrit, 31, rock singer and guitarist
April 5 – Davey Williams, 66, Avant-Garde and jazz guitarist
April 6 – Jim Glaser, 81, country singer
April 10 – Earl Thomas Conley, 77, country singer
April 15 – Joe Terry, 78, doo-wop and rock and roll (Danny & the Juniors)
April 18 – Eddie Tinger, 92, blues singer and keyboardist
April 22 – Dave Samuels, 70, jazz musician
April 26 – Phil McCormack, 58, southern rock singer (Molly Hatchet)
May 2 – John Starling, 79, bluegrass singer and songwriter (The Seldom Scene)
May 4 – J.R. Cobb, 75, guitarist and songwriter
May 9 – Preston Epps, 88, percussionist
May 11 – 
Peggy Lipton, 72, singer and actress
 Sol Yaged, 96, jazz clarinetist
May 13 – Doris Day, 97, singer and actress
May 14 –
Leon Rausch, 91, Country singer
Mike Wilhelm, 77, rock guitarist
May 15
Chuck Barksdale, 84, R&B singer, bass singer and founding member of The Dells.
Huelyn Duvall, 79, rockabilly singer and guitarist
May 17 – Eric Moore, 67, hard rock singer and bassist
May 28 – John Gary Williams, 73, R&B singer
May 29 –
Tony Glover, 79, blues singer and harmonica player
Jeff Walls, 62, guitarist and songwriter
May 30 – Leon Redbone, 69, jazz and ragtime singer, guitarist
May 31 – Roky Ericson, 71, psychedelic rock singer and songwriter
June 4 - Mikey Dees, TBD, punk rock singer and guitarist (Fitz of Depression)
June 5 – Brian Doherty, 51, guitarist (Big Wreck) 
June 6 – Dr. John, 77, blues, jazz, boogie-woogie, and rock singer, songwriter 
June 9 – 
Bushwick Bill, 52, rapper (Geto Boys)
Jim Pike, 82, pop singer (The Lettermen)
June 10 –
Chuck Glaser, 83, country singer (Tompall & the Glaser Brothers)
Paul Sinegal, 75 blues singer
June 16 – Bishop Bullwinkle, 70, soul singer
June 19 – Etika, 29, youtuber and rapper
June 23 – David Bartholomew, 100, composer and bandleader
June 24 – Jeff Austin, 45, bluegrass singer
June 29 – Gary Duncan, 72, rock guitarist
July 1 – Sid Ramin, 100, composer and arranger
July 9 – Aaron Rosand, 92, classical violinist
July 10 – Jerry Lawson, 75, a cappella singer
July 12 –
Dick Richards, 95, rock and roll drummer
Russell Smith, 70, country rock singer 
July 16 - Bill Vitt, rock drummer
July 18 – Bob Frank, 75, singer, songwriter
July 21 – Ben Johnston, 93, microtonal composer
July 22 – Art Neville, 81, funk singer, keyboardist
July 29 – Ras G, 39, hip hop producer
August 5 – Lizzie Grey, 60, glam metal guitarist
August 7
David Berman, 52, indie rock songer songwriter
Francesca Sundsten, 58, post punk bassist
Nicky Wonder, 59, power pop guitarist
August 11 – Jim Cullum Jr., 77, jazz cornetist
August 19 – Larry Taylor, 77, bass guitarist
August 27
Neal Casal, 50, rock guitarist
Donnie Fritts, 76, country keyboardist and songwriter
August 28 – Nancy Holloway, 86, jazz and pop singer
August 29 – Jimmy Pitman, 72, rock singer, songwriter and guitarist (Strawberry Alarm Clock)
September 5 – Jimmy Johnson, 76, rock and soul guitarist
September 10 –
Jeff Fenholt, 68, rock and Christian singer
Danny Johnston, 58, folk singer and songwriter
September 13 – Eddie Money, 70, singer, songwriter, multi-instrumentalist
September 15 – Ric Ocasek, 75, singer, songwriter, record producer (The Cars)
September 16 –
John Cohen, 87, folk banjoist and guitarist
Mick Shauer, 47, stoner rock keyboardist
September 19
Harold Mabern, 83, jazz pianist
Yonrico Scott, 63, rock and blues drummer
September 24 – Robert Hunter, 78, rock lyricist and multi-instrumentalist
September 26 – Jimmy Spicer, 61, rapper
September 29 – Busbee, 43, songwriter and producer
September 30 – Jessye Norman, 74, opera soprano singer
October 1 – Beverly Watkins, 80, blues guitarist
October 2 – Kim Shattuck, 56, singer-songwriter and guitarist (The Muffs, The Pandoras)
October 3 – Vinnie Bell, 87, session guitarist
October 4 – Ed Ackerson, 54, alternative rock singer and guitarist (Polara)
October 5 – Larry Junstrom, 70, southern rock bassist (38 Special, Lynyrd Skynyrd)
October 12 – 
George Chambers, 88, singer and bassist (The Chambers Brothers)
Kenny Dixon, 27, country music drummer
October 14 – Steve Cash, 73, southern rock singer
October 17 – Ray Santos, 90, Latin pop saxophonist
October 25 – Joe Sun, 76, country singer
October 26 – Paul Barrere, 71, southern rock guitarist
October 31 – Kendra Malia, 37, witch house singer
November 11 – Bad Azz, 43, rapper
November 20 – Doug Lubahn, 71, psychedelic rock and jazz rock bassist (Clear Light)
November 21
Donna Carson, 73, folk singer (Hedge and Donna)
Farris Lanier Jr., 70, R&B-soul-funk singer (Lanier & Co.)
November 29 – Irving Burgie, 95, musician and songwriter
December 2 – Jimmy Cavallo, 92, rock and roll singer 
December 5 – Jerry Naylor, 80, rock and roll musician (The Crickets)
December 7 –
Herb Cox, 81, doo-wop singer and songwriter (The Cleftones)
Joe McQueen, 100, jazz saxophonist
December 8 – Juice WRLD, 21, rapper, singer, songwriter
December 13 –
Emil Richards, 87, classical and jazz vibraphonist
Roy Loney, 73, garage rock singer and guitarist (Flamin' Groovies)
December 14 – Irv Williams, 100, jazz saxophonist
December 18 – Abbey Simon, 99, classical pianist
December 24 –
Dave Riley, 59, punk rock bassist
Allee Willis, 72, pop and funk songwriter
December 26 – Sleepy LaBeef, 84, rockabilly singer and guitarist
December 29 – Norma Tanega, 80, folk singer-songwriter

See also
2010s in music

References